Donald Isaac Pandjaitan (9 June 1925 – 1 October 1965) was an Indonesian General who was killed during a kidnap attempt by the members of the 30 September Movement. Among the 6 Army Generals who perished during the coup attempt, he was the sole Christian.

Early life
D.I. Pandjaitan was born in Sitorang, Balige in the Tapanuli region of North Sumatra. After completing elementary and high school, with the arrival of the Invading Japanese, he underwent Japanese Giyūgun military education. He was then posted to Pekanbaru, and was there when Indonesian independence was declared on 17 August 1945.

Career with the Indonesian military
In November 1945, Pandjaitan, together with other young people, helped establish a local branch of the People's Security Army (TKR), initially serving as a battalion commander. In March 1948 he was appointed commander of the commander for organization and education of XI/Banteng Division at Bukittinggi, West Sumatra. Not long after, he became fourth deputy commander (supplies) for the Sumatran Army Command, then when the Dutch launched their Second Police Action against the republic, he was put in charge of supplies for the Emergency Government of the Republic of Indonesia.

After the Dutch recognition of Indonesian sovereignty in 1949, Pandjaitan was posted to the headquarters of the Sumatran Division in Medan, and on 2 January 1950 became head of the operational staff of the I/Bukit Barisan Division. He was then transferred to Palembang, South Sumatra and appointed deputy commander of the II/Sriwijaya Division. From October 1952 to July 1957, he served as the military attache to the Indonesian embassy in Bonn, West Germany. Upon his return to Indonesia, he joined the Army General Staff. He attended a course at the US Army Command and General Staff College at Fort Leavenworth from December 1963 to June 1964. He then took up his final post as fourth assistant to the Army chief of staff for logistics and ordnance.

Death
In the early hours of 1 October 1965, a group of members of the 30 September Movement left the Lubang Buaya area on the eastern outskirts of Jakarta to seize a number of key military figures and take them hostage.  Pandjaitan was one of the senior military figures they planned to take prisoner.  The group broke the fence near Pandjaitan's house in Jalan Hasanuddin, Kebayoran Baru, South Jakarta, shot and killed one of the household staff who was sleeping on the ground floor of the two-story house before calling on Pandjaitan to come down. Two of the men involved at the time were Albert Naiborhu and Viktor Naiborhu. Both were seriously injured during the attempted kidnapping, and Albert died shortly afterwards. Pandjaitan, then in a full army dress, stepped down from the 2nd floor, allowing himself to be taken by the kidnappers. On his front yard, he stopped a moment to take small pray. After a few minutes, the kidnappers felt irritated waiting the General praying, losing patient, he was shot dead from behind. 

His body was put in a truck and taken back to the movement's headquarters at Lubang Buaya. His body, along with those of a number of his colleagues who had also been killed were thrown into a nearby well. The bodies were discovered on 4 October, and all were given a state funeral the following day. Pandjaitan, along with the other prominent military figures killed in the early hours of 1 October 1965 are buried at the Kalibata Heroes Cemetery in South Jakarta. Pandjaitan was posthumously promoted to major general and awarded the title of Hero of the Revolution.

Notes

References

 Anderson, Benedict R O'G & McVey, Ruth (1971), A Preliminary Analysis of the October 1, 1965 Coup in Indonesia, Modern Indonesian project Southeast Asian Program, Cornell University, Ithaca, NY
 Bachtiar, Harsja W. (1988), Siapa Dia?: Perwira Tinggi Tentara Nasional Indonesia Angkatan Darat (Who is S/He?: Senior Officers of the Indonesian Army), Penerbit Djambatan, Jakarta, 
 Mutiara Sumber Widya (publisher)(1999) Album Pahlawan Bangsa (Album of National Heroes), Jakarta
 Sekretariat Negara Republik Indonesia (1975) 30 Tahun Indonesia Merdeka: Jilid 3 (1965–1973) (30 Years of Indonesian Independence: Volume 3 (1965–1973)
 Secretariat Negara Republik Indonesia (1994) Gerakan 30 September Pemberontakan Partai Komunis Indonesia: Latar Belakang, Aksi dan Penumpasannya (The 30 September Movement/Communist Party of Indonesia: Bankground, Actions and its Annihilation) 
 Sudarmanto, Y.B. (1996) Jejak-Jejak Pahlawan dari Sultan Agung hingga Syekh Yusuf (The Footsteps of Heroes from Sultan Agung to Syekh Yusuf), Penerbit Grasindo, Jakarta 

1925 births
1965 deaths
Indonesian Christians
Indonesian collaborators with Imperial Japan
Indonesian generals
National Heroes of Indonesia
People from Toba Samosir Regency
People of Batak descent

jv:D.I. Panjaitan